Grzegorz Wojtkowiak (born 26 January 1984) is a Polish former professional footballer.

International career
He debuted for the Poland national team in September 2008 against San Marino.

Career statistics

Club

1 All appearances in Ekstraklasa Cup.

References

Living people
1984 births
Sportspeople from Lubusz Voivodeship
People from Kostrzyn nad Odrą
Polish footballers
Association football defenders
Poland international footballers
UEFA Euro 2012 players
Ekstraklasa players
2. Bundesliga players
II liga players
Amica Wronki players
Lech Poznań players
TSV 1860 Munich players
Lechia Gdańsk players
Lech Poznań II players